Dopasia sokolovi, Sokolov's glass lizard, is a species of lizard of the Anguidae family. It is found in Vietnam.

References

Dopasia
Reptiles described in 1983
Endemic fauna of Vietnam
Reptiles of Vietnam
Taxa named by Ilya Darevsky